Final Exit (fully titled Final Exit: The Practicalities of Self-Deliverance and Assisted Suicide for the Dying) is a 1991 book written by Derek Humphry, a British-born American journalist, author, and assisted suicide advocate who co-founded the now-defunct Hemlock Society in 1980 and co-founded the Final Exit Network in 2004. The book was first published in 1991 by the Hemlock Society US in hardback. The following year, its 2nd edition was published by Dell in trade paperback.  The current updated edition was published in 2010.

The book, often described as a "suicide manual", describes the means that the terminally ill may use to end their lives. The book further outlines relevant laws, techniques, and living wills. Final Exit was perceived as controversial, and the book drove debate regarding the right to die. Another concern was that people who were mentally ill could use the information found in the book to end their lives. Despite the controversy, Final Exit reached #1 on The New York Times Best Seller list in August of 1991.

Final Exit Network claims that approximately 750,000 copies have been sold in the United States and Canada and approximately 500,000 elsewhere.  The book is banned in France. Final Exit is Derek Humphry’s third book on the subject of self-euthanasia; it was preceded by Jean's Way (1978) and The Right to Die: Understanding Euthanasia (1986)

Success of the book
In 1991, Final Exit spent 18 weeks on The New York Times non-fiction Best Seller list, it reached #1 in August and was selected by USA Today in 2007 as one of the 25 most influential books of the quarter century.

It has been translated into 12 languages.  The original English language version is in its third edition.

In 2000, Derek Humphry recorded a VHS video version of the information in the book; a DVD version and a Kindle version were released in 2006 and 2011, respectively. A 4th edition, 'Final Exit 2020' has been released as an Ebook.

The ethicist Peter Singer included it on a list of his top ten books in The Guardian.

Reception
Final Exit has been a frequent target of censors; the novel appears on the American Library Association list of the 100 Most Frequently Challenged Books of 1990–1999 at number 29.

See also
 Euthanasia device
 Final Exit Network
 Suicide
 Suicide methods
 The Complete Manual of Suicide by Wataru Tsurumi
 The Peaceful Pill Handbook by Philip Nitschke

References

 The archives of the Hemlock Society and Derek Humphry are at the Allen Library, University of Washington, Seattle, WA

Bibliography
 Docker, Chris "Five Last Acts II and The Exit Path"
 Humphry, Derek (1991). Final Exit: The Practicalities of Self-Deliverance and Assisted Suicide for the Dying. .
 Humphry, Derek (2000). Supplement to Final Exit. 
 Humphry, Derek (2002). Final Exit: The Practicalities of Self-Deliverance and Assisted Suicide for the Dying, 3rd edition. . Delta Trade Paperback. Revised and updated.
 Humphry, Derek (2002). Let Me Die Before I Wake & Supplement to Final Exit. 
 Humphry, Derek (2008) Good Life, Good Death: Memoir of an investigative reporter and pro-choice advocate. Hardcopy and eBook. 
 
 Sutherland, John (2008) Curiosities of Literature

External links
 

1992 non-fiction books
Books about suicide
Suicide methods
Self-help books
Euthanasia